The Turkish Fencing Federation is the governing body for the sport of fencing in Turkey. It was founded in 1923. In 1924, Turkish fencers began to attend the Olympic Games. Every year, fencing tournaments are held by TFF.

The Turkish Fencing Federation is affiliated to the international Federation Internationale d'Escrime and European Fencing Confederation.

The federation in 2011 had 2500 fencers.

References

External links
 Turkish Fencing Federation website
 History of fencing in Turkey

National federations of the European Fencing Confederation
Fencing
Federation
Organizations based in Ankara
Sports organizations established in 1923
1923 establishments in Turkey